Argemma argyrosticta, the pearl-spotted forest sylph, is a species of butterfly in the family Hesperiidae. It is found in Ivory Coast, Ghana, Nigeria, Cameroon, the Republic of the Congo, the Central African Republic, the Democratic Republic of the Congo and Uganda. The habitat consists of forests.

Subspecies
Argemma argyrosticta argyrosticta - Ivory Coast, Ghana, Nigeria, Cameroon, Congo, Central African Republic
Argemma argyrosticta enta Evans, 1947 - eastern Democratic Republic of the Congo, Uganda

References

Butterflies described in 1879
Hesperiinae
Butterflies of Africa